Victoria Road (and its northern extremity Oliver Rogers Road) is a major road in Adelaide, South Australia, connecting Port Adelaide to Outer Harbor on the LeFevre Peninsula. It is designated part of route A16.

Route
Oliver Rogers Road starts at the roundabout intersection with Lady Ruthven Drive. It heads northeast along the Port Adelaide Passenger Terminal, and Outer Harbor railway station, before curving east to intersect with Bourke-Jones Road at Seahven marina, home of the Royal South Australia Yacht Squadron. It changes name to Victoria Road and curves to run south along the eastern edge of the LeFevre peninsula through Osborne, Largs Bay and Largs North, with residential settlement along its western side and mainly heavy industry along its eastern side. The road ends at an intersection with the Port River Expressway, just west of Tom 'Diver' Derrick Bridge over Port Adelaide River and Nelson Street, leading into central Port Adelaide.

Port River Expressway
Due to construction of the Port River Expressway, the southernmost point of Victoria Road has seen some major infrastructure changes. Originally the road began at the cross intersection with Nelson Street, Elders Road and Semaphore Road. When construction was completed late 2008, Victoria Road was diverted to become a continuation of the Port River Expressway, bypassing Semaphore Road and intersecting only with Nelson Street.

Major intersections
Victoria Road is entirely contained within the City of Port Adelaide Enfield local government area.

See also
Victoria Road (disambiguation)

References

Roads in Adelaide
Lefevre Peninsula